The 2017–18 Luxembourg National Division was the 104th season of top-flight football in Luxembourg. The season began on 4 August 2017 and concluded on 19 May 2018. F91 Dudelange were the defending champions from the previous season.

Teams
The bottom two teams from the previous season, Rumelange and UN Käerjéng 97, were relegated to the 2017–18 Luxembourg Division of Honour. They were replaced by Esch and Rodange 91, champions and runners-up respectively of the 2016–17 Luxembourg Division of Honour.

In addition, the third-placed team from the previous season's Division of Honour, Hostert, defeated the third-from-bottom top-flight team, Jeunesse Canach, in a play-off to seal their top-flight spot for 2017–18.

Stadia and locations

Source: Scoresway

League table

Results
Each team played every other team in the league home-and-away for a total of 26 matches played each.

Relegation play-offs
A play-off (on neutral ground) will be played between the twelfth-placed team in the 2017–18 Luxembourg National Division and the third-placed team in the 2017–18 Luxembourg Division of Honour for one place in the 2018–19 Luxembourg National Division.

Top goalscorers

See also
2017–18 Luxembourg Cup

References

External links

Luxembourg National Division seasons
1
Luxembourg